The Moondogs are a Northern Irish rock band formed in 1979, and consisting of Gerry McCandless, Austin Barrett and Jackie Hamilton. Their career spans three albums, four singles and two television programmes.

Discography

Singles
"She's Nineteen" b/w "Ya Don't Do Ya" (1979)
"Who's Gonna Tell Mary?" b/w "Overcaring Parents" (1980)
"Talking in the Canteen" b/w "Make Her Love Me - You Said" (1981)
"Imposter" b/w "Baby Snatcher" (1981)

Studio albums
That's What Friends Are For (1981)
John Peel Sessions (2003)
Red Fish (2003)

Compilation albums
Good Vibrations Punk Singles / "Ya Don't Do Ya" (Anagram - UK)
The Good Vibrations Story / "She's 19" (1994, Dojo - UK)
Powerpearls Vol.3 / "Who's Gonna Tell Mary" (Germany)
Now in Session / "That's What Friends Are For" (1982, Downtown Radio - Ireland)

Promotional items
Getting Off in Amsterdam - Everydaythings (2003, Reekus - Ireland)

Unreleased tracks
"EEC Lov"
"Two Timed"
"Boys Stories"
"TV Girl"
"Tell Tail"
"Jenny"
"I Am Trembling"
"Powerpop"
"Ten Minutes Late"
"Hey Joanna"

Other works

Television
Shellshock Rock (1979 film, featuring The Moondogs, The Outcats, Rudi, Ruefrex, SLF, The Undertones and Protex)
Moondogs Matinee (The Moondogs television programme ran for approximately seven shows in early 1981, and featured them playing live mixed with pop videos of the day. The theme tune to the show was their song, "Powerpop").

Film
The Moondogs had four of their songs featured in the film, Dead Long Enough

References

External links
Official website
Moondogs Productions
Official MySpace page
The Moondogs at Keepin' It Peel 2
The Moondogs at Keepin' It Peel 1
Punk In Derry
German Page on The Moondogs

Punk rock groups from Northern Ireland
Musical groups from Derry (city)